BlaBlaCar is a French online marketplace for carpooling. Its website and mobile apps connect drivers and passengers willing to travel together between cities and share the cost of the journey. The company does not own any vehicles; it is a broker and receives a commission (between 18% and 21%) from every booking.

The platform has 100 million members, of which 25 million are active per quarter, and is available in 22 countries, almost all of which are in Europe and Latin America – countries include: Belgium, Brazil, Croatia, Czech Republic, France, Germany, Hungary, India, Italy, Luxembourg, Mexico, The Netherlands, Poland, Portugal, Romania, Russia, Serbia, Slovakia, Spain, Turkey, Ukraine, and the United Kingdom.

According to TechCrunch, the company does not operate in the United States because "gas is cheaper there, cities are too far from each other and too big to conveniently pick up and drop off people".

The service is named for its rating scale for drivers' preferred level of chattiness in the car: "Bla" for not very chatty, "BlaBla" for someone who likes to talk, and "BlaBlaBla" for those who can't keep quiet.

History
In 2004, Vincent Caron bought the domain name Covoiturage.fr and launched the first version of the site Covoiturage.fr. In 2006, the domain name was sold to Frédéric Mazzella. He created the company Comuto which would become the company owner of every car-pool site.

In August 2008, Comuto launched the second version of the website. The new version includes a community aspect allowing public recommendation, profiles, and biographies. Covoiturage.fr was both a travel website and a community website. As early as September 2008, Covoiturage.fr became the number one carpool web site in France.

In 2009, Comuto launched a Spanish version of the site under the name of Comuto.es. Throughout the year, Comuto opened a lot of carpool services for companies and cities, such as MAIF, IKEA, Vinci Park, RATP, Carrefour, the city of Montrouge and  multiple others. In December 2009, the company unveiled its iPhone application, with the android version becoming available in February 2010.

In June 2011, Comuto introduced BlaBlaCar.com in the United Kingdom.

In June 2012, an online reservation service was added to Covoiturage.fr. Users buy their trip online and the web site transfers part of the ticket price to the driver. This solution had been tested in Western France since 2011. The web service put in place its business model and began to make profits. It was also a way to attract drivers and to reach the critical mass. Between July and November, Comuto expanded to Italy, Portugal, Poland, Netherlands, Luxembourg, and Belgium.

In April 2013, BlaBlaCar was launched in Germany where many other carpool sites already exist. On 29 April, Covoiturage.fr was re-branded BlaBlaCar.fr in order to unify all the sites under one name. At the end of the year, BlaBlaCar revealed that they have 5 million members with 1 million monthly active users spread through 10 countries.

In January 2014, BlaBlaCar was introduced in Ukraine and Russia, the company strongly considered Brazil as its next destination for expansion. In September, the service had 10 million users.

In January 2015, BlaBlaCar expanded to India. The company bought multiple competitors, including Carpooling in Germany, Autohop in eastern Europe, and Rides in Mexico. The last operation allowed the company to establish itself in the Americas, particularly in Mexico. At this time, the company had 290 employees on three continents and 20 million users in 19 countries. On 18 May, BlaBlaCar signed a partnership with Axa in order to insure its users.

In October 2016, BlaBlaCar signed a contract with GoEuro, a remuneration based on the number of established connections.

In April 2017, a long term rental service was offered to the best drivers. It was the result of a partnership with the constructor Opel and the company ALD Automotive, specializing in long term rental. On 2 May, another application was launched: BlaBlaLines, an application for daily carpool, experimented on two lines in France. The iOS counterpart is launched on 14 September.

These international expansions found mixed success. In 2017, the company closed its offices in India, Turkey and Mexico. Executives said they had spent too much and hired too aggressively in those territories. In contrast, the move into Russia proved to be a stunning success as the country which has become BlaBlaCar's largest market.  Overall, the company has become far more diversified in terms of geography. While 75% of its users were in France in 2015, by 2021 the company reported that  80% of its riders were outside of France and 60% were outside of Europe. 

On 30 January 2018, BlaBlaCar unveiled a new corporate identity and style guide. A new algorithm was also put in place to increase the number of trips proposed for users. As of June 2018, BlaBlaCar had 60 million members in 22 countries and over 18 million travellers every quarter.

In November 2018, BlaBlaCar announced the purchase of long-distance coach operator Ouibus from SNCF. As part of the transaction, SNCF became a shareholder in BlaBlaCar. Ouibus was rebranded BlaBlaBus. In addition, BlaBlaCar also raised $114 million from SNCF and previous investors. In 2019, BlaBlaCar acquired Russia’s largest bus booking platform, Busfor. 

In 2021, bus seats represented 20% of all bookings on the BlaBlaCar platform.

Funding
In 2009, the company raised €600,000 from the founders and their friends and family.

In June 2010, Comuto raised €1.25 million from ISAI run by Jean-David Chamboredon.

In January 2012, Comuto raised €7.5 million from Accel Partners, ISAI and Cabiedes & Partners to develop its activities in Europe.

In July 2014, BlaBlaCar raised US$100 million from Index Ventures. In September 2015, the company raised another USD $200 million, primarily from Insight Venture Partners, in a round that valued the company at $1.6 billion.

In April 2021, BlaBlaCar raised $115 million.

References

2006 establishments in France
Companies based in Paris
Carsharing
Location-based software
Multilingual websites
Ridesharing companies of France

Shared transport
Transport companies established in 2006